This is a list of the tallest structures of any kind which exist or existed in Europe. The list contains all types of structures, including guyed masts and oil drilling platforms of 350 metres (1,150 feet) or more.

Sortable list

History 
The following is a list of structures that were historically the tallest in Europe.

Gallery 
Some of the highest structures in Europe

See also 
 List of tallest structures in the world
 List of tallest buildings in Europe

External links

 Map of the tallest structures in Europe
 Height Comparison at Skyscraperpage

Europe
Tall